Torani may refer to 

 Torani a brand of Italian style syrups and flavor bases
 Torani Canal, the Torani Canal in northeastern Guyana
 Torani, Bihar - a village in India

See also
 Turani (disambiguation)